Spiracle or spiraculum may refer to:

 Spiracle (arthropods), opening in the exoskeletons of some arthropods
 Spiracle (vertebrates), openings on the surface of some vertebrates
 Spiraculum, a genus of land snails in family Cyclophoridae